Neuropeltopsis is a monotypic genus of flowering plants belonging to the family Convolvulaceae. The only species is Neuropeltopsis alba.

Its native range is Borneo.

References

Convolvulaceae
Monotypic Convolvulaceae genera